The encyclical Magnae dei matris (The Great Mother of God) was issued on 8 September 1892. It is subtitled "The Rosary and Christian Life".

With this encyclical Leo continues the series of rosary encyclicals and emphasizes the following characteristics: the Rosary as an aid and voice of prayer; in the Rosary, Mary's life is portrayed as an example; the continuous prayer of the Rosary serves piety and is a holy source of divine consolation.

"[A]s we are indebted to Christ for sharing in some way with us the right, which is peculiarly His own, of calling God our Father and possessing Him as such, we are in like manner indebted to Him for His loving generosity in sharing with us the right to call Mary our Mother and to cherish her as such." "For it is mainly by faith that a man sets out on the straight and sure path to God and learns to revere in mind and heart His supreme majesty, His sovereignty over the whole of creation, His unsounded power, wisdom, and providence. For he who comes to God must believe that God exists and is a rewarder to those who seek Him."

Leo describes the Rosary as presenting the chief mysteries of the faith for contemplation, and presents Mary "a most suitable example of every virtue."     

In Magnae Dei Matris, Leo derided the license of his times, particularly as demonstrated in the sciences and arts and the writings of the press and the "consequent laxity" in the practice of the Faith:

"We have good reason to deplore the public institutions in which the teaching of the sciences and arts is purposely so organized that the name of God is passed over in silence or visited with vituperation; to deplore the license - growing more shameless by the day - of the press in publishing whatever it pleases, and the license of speech in addressing any kind of insult to Christ our God and His Church. And We deplore no less the consequent laxity and apathy in the practice of the Catholic religion which if not quite open apostasy from the Faith, is certainly going to prove an easy road to it, since it is a manner of life having nothing in common with faith."

See also 

 List of encyclicals of Pope Leo XIII on the Rosary

References 

Encyclicals of Pope Leo XIII
1892 documents
1892 in Christianity